Estadio Nacional is an underground metro station on the Line 6 of the Santiago Metro, in Santiago, Chile. This station is so named due to being in the northeastern corner of the Estadio Nacional Julio Martínez Prádanos, main sports center of the country. The station has a special design, different from the rest of the stations, because its large dimensions allow managing large flows of people during sporting or recreational events in the stadium. The station was opened on 2 November 2017 as part of the inaugural section of the line, between Cerrillos and Los Leones.

References

Santiago Metro stations
Santiago Metro Line 6